William Sanders may refer to:

 William Sanders (basketball) (born 1972), American basketball player
 William Sanders (businessman) (born 1941), American real estate businessman and developer
 William Sanders (geologist) (1799–1875), English merchant
 William Sanders (organist) (1867–1955), South Australian choirmaster, organist and music columnist
 William Sanders (pastoralist) (1801–1880), Australian pastoralist and businessman
 William Sanders (politician) (1871–1941), British Labour Party politician
 William Sanders (statistician) (1942–2017), senior research fellow with the University of North Carolina
 William Sanders (writer) (1942–2017), American speculative fiction writer
 William David Sanders (1951–1999), U.S. teacher and victim of Columbine High School massacre
 William Edward Sanders (1883–1917), New Zealand Victoria Cross recipient
 William Evan Sanders (born 1919), American bishop
 William J. Sanders, paleontologist
 William P. Sanders (1833–1863), U.S. soldier
 William T. Sanders (1926–2008), anthropologist specialized in archaeology of Mesoamerica
 William Bliss Sanders (1841–1896), architect based in Nottingham
 William Rutherford Sanders (1828–1881), Scottish pathologist
 Bill Sanders (born 1930), American political cartoonist
 Billy Sanders (1955–1985), Australian international speedway rider
 Billy C. Sanders (born 1936), U.S. Navy sailor and Master Chief Petty Officer of the Navy

See also
 William Saunders (disambiguation)